Dmitry Fofonov (born 15 August 1976 in Almaty) is a former Kazakh professional road bicycle racer who was fired from UCI ProTeam Crédit Agricole for doping.

Fofonov tested positive for heptaminol after the 18th stage of the 2008 Tour de France. Fofonov had completed the race in 19th place, and was fired by Crédit Agricole after the test. After his doping ban ended, Fofonov joined the  team for the 2010 season. He retired after the 2012 season and became an assistant sporting director for Astana.

Major results

1998
 Sprint Champion
 1st, Touf of China
 1st, Stage 15, Commonwealth Bank Classic
2000
  Sprint Champion
 1st, Zellik–Galmaarden
2001
 57th, Vuelta a España
2002
 14th, Volta a Catalunya
 Winner Stage 7
2004
 4th, Züri-Metzgete
 87th, Tour de France
2005
 4th, National Road Race Championship
 89th, Giro d'Italia
2006
 20th, Paris–Nice
 32nd, Vuelta a España
2007
 16th, Critérium du Dauphiné Libéré
2008
 19th overall, Tour de France
2009
 1st, Asian Cycling Championships Road Race

See also
 List of doping cases in cycling

References

External links 
 

1976 births
Doping cases in cycling
Living people
Kazakhstani male cyclists
Kazakhstani sportspeople in doping cases
Asian Games medalists in cycling
Cyclists at the 1998 Asian Games
Medalists at the 1998 Asian Games
Asian Games silver medalists for Kazakhstan